Abhayam may refer to:

Abhayam, Malayalam film released in 1970 starring Madhu and Sheela
Abhayam, Malayalam film released in 1991 starring Madhu and Parvathy